Oriostomatidae is an extinct taxonomic family of fossil sea snails, marine gastropod mollusks in the clade Neritimorpha.

Genera
Genera within the family Oriostomatidae include: 
 Australonema
 Beraunia
 Didymalgia
 Dormella
 Gemininodoa
 Hecatastoma
 Omphalonema
 Oriomphalus
 Oriostoma
 Tophicola
 Tubogyra

References

 Koken, E. (1896). Die Gastropoden der Trias um Hallstadt. Jahrbuch der Kaiserlich-Königlichen Geologischen Reichsanstalt. 46(1): 37−126
 Paleobiology database info

Prehistoric gastropods